Vietnam competed at the 1980 Summer Olympics in Moscow, USSR. This was the first participation in the Olympics by the nation following the end of the Vietnam War and the Reunification of Vietnam.

Results by event

Athletics
Men's 1,500 metres
Lê Quang Khải
 Heat — 4:06.8 (→ did not advance)

Men's Marathon
 Nguyễn Quyễn
 Final — 2:44:37 (→ 50th place)

Men's Triple Jump
Dương Đức Thủy
 Qualification — 14.59 m (→ did not advance)

Women's 1,500 metres
 Trịnh Thị Bé
 Heat — 4:38.6 (→ did not advance)

Women's 100 metres
 Trần Thanh Vân
 Heat — 13.23 (→ did not advance)

Women's 200 metres
 Trần Thị Ngọc Anh
 Heat — 26.83 (→ did not advance)

Women's 400 metres
 Trần Thị Ngọc Anh
 Heat — 1:00.62 (→ did not advance)

Women's Long Jump
 Nguyễn Thị Hoàng Na
 Qualifying Round — 5.35 m (→ did not advance, 19th place)

Shooting
Open

Swimming
Men's 100m Freestyle
 Tô Văn Vệ
 Heats — 56.75 (→ did not advance)

Men's 200m Freestyle
 Tô Văn Vệ
 Heats — 2:11.51 (→ did not advance)

Men's 100 m Backstroke
Lâm Văn Hoành
 Heats — 1:07.29 (→ did not advance)

Men's 200 m Backstroke
Phạm Ngọc Tánh
 Heats — 2:28.40 (→ did not advance)

Men's 100 m Breaststroke
Nguyễn Mạnh Tuấn
 Heats — 1:10.07 (→ did not advance)

Men's 200 m Breaststroke
Trần Dương Tài
 Heats — 2:38.52 (→ did not advance)

Men's 100 m Butterfly
Nguyễn Ðăng Bình
 Heats — 1:00.74

Men's 200 m Butterfly
Trương Ngọc Tơn
 Heats — 2:23.58

Women's 100 m Freestyle
Chung Thị Thanh Lan
 Heats — 1:12.27

Women's 100 m Backstroke
Nguyễn Thị Hồng Bích
 Heats — 1:20.34

Women's 200 m Backstroke
Nguyễn Thị Hồng Bích
 Heats — 2:52.90

Women's 100 m Breaststroke
Phạm Thị Phú
 Heats — 1:22.73 (→ did not advance)

Women's 200 m Breaststroke
Hoàng Thị Hoà
 Heats — 2:55.94 (→ did not advance)

Wrestling
Men's freestyle

Legend
TF — Won by Fall
IN — Won by Opponent Injury
DQ — Won by Passivity
D1 — Won by Passivity, the winner is passive too
D2 — Both wrestlers lost by Passivity
FF — Won by Forfeit
DNA — Did not appear
TPP — Total penalty points
MPP — Match penalty points

Notes

References

Nations at the 1980 Summer Olympics
1980
1980 in Vietnamese sport